Cameron Smith (born 7 November 1998) is an English professional rugby league footballer who plays as a  and  for the Leeds Rhinos in the Super League and the England Knights at international level.

Smith has spent time on loan from Leeds at the Bradford Bulls and Featherstone Rovers in the Championship.

Early life
Smith was born in Pontefract, West Yorkshire, England. He is the brother of fellow professional player Daniel Smith.

Cameron Smith attended Castleford Academy in a period from 2010 - 2015. He then furthered his education at NEW College, Pontefract by taking BTEC Level 3 Extended Diploma in sport. He captained his high school side Castleford Academy to win the National Cup, Yorkshire Cup and the Wakefield district cup.

Cameron's youth career saw him play for his local team Castleford Panthers where he made over 60 appearances for the club.

Playing career

Leeds Rhinos
In 2013 Leeds approached Smith to join their academy team. He then went on to take the captaincy band for Leeds Rhinos' Under 16's and England Under 16's

Smith made his début for Leeds Rhinos from the interchange bench in their loss against Wakefield Trinity which ended 14-6. He then later featured against the Hunslet Hawks again from the interchange bench in a thrilling 22-18 victory. Smith's latest venture with Leeds was his trip to Florida where he gained another cap against USA Pioneers.  On 24 September 2022, Smith played for Leeds in their 24-12 loss to St Helens RFC in the 2022 Super League Grand Final.

International career
In 2019 he was selected for the England Knights against Jamaica at Headingley Rugby Stadium.

References

External links

Leeds Rhinos profile
SL profile

1998 births
Living people
Bradford Bulls players
England Knights national rugby league team players
English rugby league players
Featherstone Rovers players
Leeds Rhinos players
Rugby league locks
Rugby league players from Pontefract